Lucy Elizabeth Fry (born 13 March 1992) is an Australian actress. She is known for portraying Zoey in Lightning Point, Lyla in Mako: Island of Secrets, and Lissa Dragomir in the film Vampire Academy. Fry was also cast in Hulu's eight part miniseries 11.22.63 as Marina Oswald, wife of Lee Harvey Oswald, and played the lead in the 2016 Australian horror television series Wolf Creek and Tikka in the 2017 Netflix film Bright. Since 2019, she has portrayed Stella in the Epix series Godfather of Harlem.

Early life
Fry was born in Wooloowin, Queensland, Australia in 1992. She attended Brisbane Girls Grammar School in Brisbane, Queensland, and began studying theatre at an early age, training with the Brisbane-based physical theatre company, Zen Zen Zo. In 2007, she was a runnerup in Girlfriend Magazine's Model Search.

Career 
She made an uncredited appearance in the season 3 finale of H2O: Just Add Water, in 2010. Her first major role on television was as Zoey in Lightning Point. From there she moved on to play Lyla, one of the lead mermaid roles, in season 1 of Mako: Island of Secrets, a spin-off of H2O: Just Add Water.

In 2014, she had her first big screen roles, as Lissa Dragomir in Vampire Academy and as Honey in Now Add Honey. In 2015, Fry co-starred in The Preppie Connection opposite Thomas Mann, playing the role of Alex. In 2016, she appeared in the films Mr. Church, with Eddie Murphy and Britt Robertson, and The Darkness, with Kevin Bacon. The same year, she played lead character Eve Thorogood in the Australian miniseries Wolf Creek. She also starred in 11.22.63 playing Marina, the wife of Lee Harry Oswald. In October 2016 Fry was cast as Tikka, a young elf who possess powers over a magical wand, in the 2017 fantasy film Bright which stars Will Smith and Joel Edgerton. In July 2017 Fry was cast to star as Heidi in the film She's Missing alongside Eiza González.

In July 2019, she joined the cast of Last Looks, an American-British action thriller by Tim Kirkby, based on a novel Last Looks by Howard Michael Gould. In the same year, she was seen as Stella in crime drama television series, Godfather of Harlem, which premiered in September 2019 on Epix. In February 2020, it was announced that she would star in Netflix thriller film Night Teeth.

Filmography

Film

Television

Music videos 

 Thirsty Merc (2010) by Tommy and Krista

Theatre

References

External links 

Lucy Fry's profile on her agency website

1992 births
Living people
21st-century Australian actresses
Australian television actresses
Actresses from Brisbane
Australian film actresses